KK Železničar may refer to:
 Basketball teams in Serbia
KK Železničar Beograd, based in Belgrade
KK Železničar Čačak, based in Čačak (1949–present)
KK Železničar Inđija, based in Inđija (1970–present)
KK Železničar Lajkovac, based in Lajkovac (1978–present)
 Basketball teams in Slovenia,
Železničar Ljubljana, based in Ljubljana (1943–1960)
Železničar Maribor, based in Maribor (1946–2006)

See also 
 KK Željezničar Sarajevo
 FK Železničar (disambiguation)